The Freedom Shop is the name of an anarchist infoshop which distributes books and information, based in Wellington, New Zealand. It operates on a non profit basis, injecting any income back into the project. The shop has been based in different locations and mainly sells books on anarchism, feminism, indigenous rights, ecology and a range of activist issues. It also carries patches, badges, clothing and music.

History 

The Freedom Shop was established on May 1, 1995. It was based on upper Cuba Street in Te Aro, in a building formerly occupied by the NORML shop. To begin with, NORML continued to pay the rent. The shop was run by volunteers and any profits were ploughed back into the venture. The shop sold books, magazines, pamphlets, leaflets, T-shirts, patches, records, and stickers.

In the 2000s, plans for the construction of the Wellington Inner City Bypass meant that the Freedom Shop would be evicted. However, the plans were bitterly contested. When security guards employed by Transit NZ broke into the shop and changed the locks, 50 activists broke in and briefly re-opened it.

The Freedom Shop moved into a more prominent location in the Cake Shop (a community infoshop/internet cafe in mid Cuba St). When the Cake Shop closed in 2005, the Freedom Shop relocated to Oblong (a community infoshop/internet cafe) in Te Aro's left bank arcade. Oblong closed in early 2009, and The Freedom Shop reverted to running stalls at public events. However, for the last few years the Freedom Shop has a home in a corner of the Newtown Opportunity for Animals Co-op Shop in Riddiford St, Newtown, Wellington.

Publications 
In 2014, the collective published the first issue of a periodical called AARGH! as the Aoteroa Anarchist Review. Issue ten was published in April 2019.

Affiliations 

The collective maintains close links with Aotearoa Indymedia and local radical groups such as the 128 Community Centre.

References

External links 
 The Freedom Shop
 Newtown Opportunity for Animals
 Aotearoa Indymedia

Infoshops
Anarchist bookstores
Anarchist organisations in New Zealand